Rajkot Secunderabad Express (Train No.s 22717 / 22718) refers to a pair of superfast trains operated by the South Central Railway zone of the Indian Railways between  in Gujarat and  in Hyderabad, Telangana.

History 
The Rajkot–Secunderabad Express is a popular train in the South Central Railway zone of the Indian Railways. It is only one of three trains connecting Hyderabad with Rajkot in the state of Gujarat, the other two being the Bhavnagar Terminus–Kakinada Port Express and the Rameswaram–Okha Express. The train was introduced in the year 1985 to run from Ahmedabad to Hyderabad as a weekly super-fast train. But, due to the increasing rush of passengers the train was made bi-weekly in June 2001 and tri-weekly in April 2003. The train was later extended to Rajkot and was degraded to Express status as the number of stops were increased.

Over the years, some class train coaches have been augmented or reduced, train numbers were changed from 17017 / 17018 to 22717 / 22718 and it was converted from an express to a superfast train in late 2021.

Coach composition

The train has standard ICF rakes with max speed of 110 kmph. The train consists of 21/22 coaches:

 2 AC II Tier
 5 AC III Tier
 10 Sleeper coaches
 2/3 General Unreserved
 2 Seating cum Luggage Rake

Service

The 22717/Rajkot–Secunderabad Express has an average speed of 56 km/hr and covers 1472 km in 26 hrs 10 mins.

The 22718/Secunderabad–Rajkot Express has an average speed of 55 km/hr and covers 1472 km in 26 hrs 50 mins.

Route and halts

Schedule

Traction

Both trains are hauled by a Sabarmati-based WDP-4D diesel locomotive from Rajkot to Ahmedabad Junction. From Ahmedabad Junction trains are hauled by a Vijayawada-based WAP-4 or Lallaguda-based WAP-7 electric locomotive upto Secunderabad Junction.

Rake sharing

The train shares its rake with 17037/17038 Secunderabad–Hisar Express and 17001/17002 Sainagar Shirdi–Secunderabad Express.

References

External links

 India Rail Info: Secunderabad Rajkot Express/22717
 India Rail Info: Rajkot Secunderabad Express/22718
 India9.com: Rajkot Secunderabad Express

Transport in Rajkot
Transport in Secunderabad
Express trains in India
Rail transport in Gujarat
Rail transport in Karnataka
Rail transport in Maharashtra
Rail transport in Telangana
Railway services introduced in 1987